Quercus similis, the swamp post oak or bottomland post oak, is an oak species native to the southeastern and south-central United States. The greatest concentration of populations is in Louisiana and Arkansas, Mississippi, and eastern Texas, with isolated population in Missouri, Alabama, and the Coastal Plain of Georgia and South Carolina.

It has a straight trunk. The bark is brown and flaky. The apex is acute or rounded, base shortly indicated. The leaf margins are flat with two or three pairs of shallow lobes apical half, shiny dark green on top but gray underneath between 3 and 5 pairs of veins. The petiole is between 3 and 10 mm long. The flowers appear in spring. It produces acorns one at a time or in groups of three.

References

External links
 Photo of herbarium specimen at Missouri Botanical Garden, collected in Missouri in 2012

similis
Trees of the United States
Plants described in 1922